Mriganka Mohan Sur was  an Indian politician. He was a Member of Parliament  representing West Bengal in the Rajya Sabha the upper house of India's Parliament as member  of the  Indian National Congress.

References

Rajya Sabha members from West Bengal
Indian National Congress politicians
1889 births
Year of death missing